The 1981 Supertaça Cândido de Oliveira was the 3rd edition of the Supertaça Cândido de Oliveira, the annual Portuguese football season-opening match contested by the winners of the previous season's top league and cup competitions (or cup runner-up in case the league- and cup-winning club is the same). The 1981 Supertaça Cândido de Oliveira was contested over two legs, and opposed Benfica and Porto of the Primeira Liga. Benfica qualified for the SuperCup by winning both the 1980–81 Primeira Divisão and the 1980–81 Taça de Portugal, whilst Porto qualified for the Supertaça as the cup runner-up.

The first leg which took place at the Estádio da Luz, saw a comfortable Benfica 2–0 win. The second leg which took place at the Estádio das Antas saw Porto defeat Benfica 4–1 (4–3 on aggregate), which granted the Dragões their first Supertaça.

First leg

Details

Second leg

Details

References

Supertaça Cândido de Oliveira
Super
S.L. Benfica matches
FC Porto matches